The González–Álvarez House, also known as The Oldest House, is a historic house museum at 14 St. Francis Street in St. Augustine, Florida.  With a construction history dating to about 1723, it is believed to be the oldest surviving house in St. Augustine.  It is also an important example of St. Augustine's Spanish colonial architectural style, with later modifications by English owners.  It was designated a U.S. National Historic Landmark in 1970.  The house is now owned by the St. Augustine Historical Society and is open for public tours as part of the Oldest House Museum Complex. Evidence can be seen of the Spanish, British, and American occupations of St. Augustine.

Description and history
The González–Álvarez House is located in a residential area south of downtown St. Augustine, on the north side of St. Francis Street between Charlotte and Marine Streets.  It is a two-story structure, its first floor built of coquina and its upper level framed in wood with a clapboarded exterior.  It is covered by a hip roof finished with wooden shingles.  The building is reflective of multiple periods of alteration and enlargement, during different periods of colonial administration.

The land on which this house stands has been occupied since the 17th century, when a building is documented to have been standing here. The present house's earliest period of construction dates to about 1723, when the first floor was built, and it was documented as being occupied by Tomás González y Hernández, an artilleryman at the Castillo de San Marcos, and his family.  The design of this house is one that was adopted by Spanish colonial settlers to deal with local living conditions and available building materials.  It was built of readily available coquina limestone, with its main thick walls oriented east–west, and has an open covered loggia on the east side.  The latter allows prevailing southeasterly winds to cool the structure, while the thick walls provide insulation from hot weather.  The interior floors are made of tabby concrete.

After the British took over Florida in 1763, the González family left for Cuba.  In 1774 the house was purchased by Major Joseph Peavett, an Englishman, who added the wood-frame second story, and put glass windows into openings previously only enclosed by wooden shutters.  It was further enlarged by the third owner, Geronimo Alvarez, who added a two-story wing built of coquina.  The house was taken over by the St. Augustine Historical Society in 1918, which undertook its restoration to a late 19th-century appearance in 1959–60, reversing a number of intervening alterations.

List of families who lived in the oldest house 
First Spanish period
 1625–1763, family of Tomas González y Hernández & María Francisco de Guevara 
British period and second Spanish period
1775–1790, Joseph Peavett & Maria Evans
 Second Spanish period and into statehood
1790–1882, Family of Gerónimo Álvarez & Antonia Vens 
1882–1918, William B. Duke family (1882–1884), Mary Carver and Dr. Charles P. Carver (1884–1898), James W. Henderson family (1898–1911), George T. Reddington and the South Beach Alligator Farm 1911–1918
1918–present, St. Augustine Historical Society

References

Wilson, Leslie (2002). "Families who lived in the Oldest House, St. Augustine, Florida ca. 1720s to 1918 / Leslie Wilson.", St. Augustine Historical Society, 1(28).

External links

Florida's Office of Cultural and Historical Programs
St. Johns County listings  at Florida's Office of Cultural and Historical Programs
St. Johns County markers
Oldest House Museum Complex at Florida's Historic A1A Coastal Scenic Byway

Gallery

Houses completed in the 18th century
Houses on the National Register of Historic Places in Florida
Museums in St. Augustine, Florida
National Historic Landmarks in Florida
National Register of Historic Places in St. Johns County, Florida
Historic house museums in Florida
Historical society museums in Florida
Houses in St. Johns County, Florida
Vernacular architecture in Florida
Historic American Buildings Survey in Florida
Spanish Florida